Newman is an unincorporated community in Stark County, in the U.S. state of Ohio.

History
A post office called Newman was established in 1889, and remained in operation until 1906. The community takes its name from nearby Newman Creek.

References

Unincorporated communities in Stark County, Ohio
Unincorporated communities in Ohio